A floating island or île flottante is a dessert consisting of meringue floating on crème anglaise (a vanilla custard). The meringue used is baked in a bain-marie.  It may be served at room temperature or chilled.

Terminology
Œufs à la neige ("eggs in snow") is a similar dessert where the meringue is in egg-sized pieces and poached, rather than in one large baked piece.

History
The earliest known English language reference to the dessert is in The Art of Cookery Made Plain and Easy (1747) by Hannah Glasse. Her recipe, entitled The Flooting Island (sic), is made with sweetened thick cream, sack and lemon peel whipped into a froth, then layered with thin slices of bread alternating with jelly, piled high with the stiffened froth. Fruits and sweetmeats are arranged in a ring around the edge of the dish that is presented as a centerpiece for the table with candles all around it.

A 1771 letter from Benjamin Franklin reported "At dinner had a floating island". An 1847 American cookbook lists floating island as a Fourth of July celebration dessert.

The historical form of the dessert was quite different in England than in France, where it was known as Île Flottante. Some scholars say that today's "Floating Island" more closely resembles the 18th century French Île Flottante than the elaborate cake and jelly constructions of English cuisine, while others say that the early French versions were not made with meringue at all, but layers of liquor soaked spongecake or brioche served in custard sauce (or berry puree).

Elizabeth Raffald's 18th century recipe published in The Experienced English Housekeeper seeks to create a pastoral winter landscape:
"beat the white of an egg to a strong froth, and roll a sprig of myrtle in it to imitate snow ... let it stand till it is quite cold and stiff, then lay on rock candied-sweetmeats upon the top of your jelly, and sheep and swans to pick at the myrtle; stick green sprigs in two or three places on top of your jelly, amongst your shapes".

According to Larousse Gastronomique the dessert was served a little less by the time the encyclopedia was published in 1938, and its writers expressed regret because the dish is "excellent". The version recorded in the Larousse Gastronomique was made with stale Savoy biscuits sliced thin and soaked in kirsch and maraschino, layered with apricot marmalade, and a garnish of chopped almonds and currants. The layers were assembled to form a type of cake that was frosted with chantilly cream, with either custard or berry puree poured over the whole thing.

Preparation

Floating island typically consists of a meringue served floating on a light custard sauce. Some variations invert this by using a thicker sauce served on top of the meringue instead.

To make the meringue, the egg whites are beaten with sugar and poured into a mold that may be lined with caramelised sugar. It is then steamed in the oven in a bain-marie. Once the meringue is cooked and chilled, the sauce is poured on a serving plate, and the unmolded meringue placed on the sauce to "float".

Cultural depictions 
In the 1957 film Desk Set, Katharine Hepburn's character Bunny Watson served Richard Sumner (Spencer Tracy) floating island dessert.

In Jack London's story, The Apostate, floating island is a dish that holds a near-mythical ideal to the working class lead character.

Floating island is mentioned in the Maud Hard Lovelace book Heaven to Betsy.

In the Nancy Drew mystery story The Hidden Staircase, floating island is served at Twin Elms. 

In American Horror Story: Coven, floating island is one of Myrtle Snow's favorite desserts after key lime pie.

See also

 List of custard desserts
 List of dairy products
 List of French desserts

References

External links

Custard desserts
French desserts
American desserts
British desserts
Historical foods in American cuisine
Meringue desserts
Hungarian pastries